Michaïlou Dramé (born 3 July 1992) is a Burkinabé football midfielder who plays for Salitas.

References

1992 births
Living people
Burkinabé footballers
Burkina Faso international footballers
ES Hammam-Sousse players
Étoile Sportive du Sahel players
Al-Ahly SC (Benghazi) players
Najran SC players
AS Marsa players
Stade Gabèsien players
Al-Ahli SC (Tripoli) players
Al-Nahda Club (Saudi Arabia) players
AS Gabès players
Association football midfielders
Burkinabé expatriate footballers
Expatriate footballers in Tunisia
Burkinabé expatriate sportspeople in Tunisia
Expatriate footballers in Libya
Burkinabé expatriate sportspeople in Libya
Expatriate footballers in Saudi Arabia
Burkinabé expatriate sportspeople in Saudi Arabia
Salitas FC players
Libyan Premier League players
21st-century Burkinabé people